The Battle of Baekgang or Battle of Baekgang-gu, also known as Battle of Hakusukinoe in Japan, as Battle of Baijiangkou in China, was a battle between Baekje restoration forces and their ally, Yamato Japan, against the allied forces of Silla and Tang China. The battle took place in the Baengma River or Baek River, which is the lower reach of the Geum River in Jeollabuk-do province, Korea. The Silla-Tang forces won a decisive victory, compelling Yamato Japan to withdraw completely from Korean affairs and crushing the Baekje restoration movement.

Background
In the first half of the first millennium CE, the Korean Peninsula was divided into three kingdoms – Baekje, Silla, and Goguryeo. Despite sharing similar cultures and using mutually-intelligible languages (while the language of Silla is described in modern-day scholarship as Old Korean, the languages of Baekje and Goguryeo are poorly-attested; although contemporary records suggest that the languages of the three kingdoms were mutually-intelligible, some research suggests that, for instance, Baekje may have used two languages – one related to Silla's Old Korean and another linked to what is called Peninsular Japonic; tradition and some contemporary sources indicate that Baekje and Goguryeo used the same language, as Baekje is said by these sources to have been founded by migrants from Goguryeo), these three kingdoms were rivals, and had engaged each other in wars for dominion over the peninsula for several centuries. In addition to the inter-Korean rivalry, Goguryeo had been engaged in frequent warfare with the Chinese Sui and Tang dynasties. While the three Korean kingdoms were not always military enemies, their alliances frequently shifted; a kingdom would become allies with one of the other two, only to later turn against that kingdom and (sometimes) become allies with the other kingdom against whom it had fought earlier. For example, Silla and Baekje would be allied against Goguryeo (as they were from the late 420s to the early 550s), and later Silla (or Baekje) would betray the other (as happened in 553, when Silla wrested control of the entire Han River basin from Baekje
). By 660, this state of affairs had been going on for some 3–4 centuries.

Silla had an ongoing alliance with the Tang dynasty dating roughly to the Tang rise to power in the 620s. The Tang made a series of assaults against Goguryeo, but was not conquer it yet. All the Tang invasions had been from the north attacking south. Tang decided that the best strategy might be to attack Goguryeo from both the northern front and a southern front simultaneously with their ally Silla. However, in order to do so, they (Tang and Silla) had to eliminate Baekje (at the time allied to Goguryeo) and secure a base of operations in southern Korea for a second front. The military campaign against Baekje began in 660.

Together, Silla and Tang invaded Baekje and effectively eliminated it when they captured the capital of Sabi, Baekje's last king Uija, and most of the royal family. Soon afterwards, however, the Baekje people revolted and threw off Silla and Tang rule in large areas of northern Baekje. The Baekje general Boksin attempted to take back the 40 lost counties still under Silla-Tang control. He also recalled Prince Buyeo Pung from Japan (a number of members of the Baekje royal family resided in Japan as hostages who mortgaged the alliance of Baekje with Japan), sent 100 Tang prisoners to the Yamato court, and requested military aid. General Boksin proclaimed Prince Buyeo Pung as the new king of Baekje. Although the restoration forces had some initial success against Tang and Silla troops, by 662, they were in serious trouble, and their area of control was confined to the fortress of Churyu and its immediate vicinity. As their situation went from bad to worse, Buyeo Pung had Boksin killed for fear of insurrection.

Baekje and Yamato Japan had been long-standing allies by this time, and their royal houses were related. The fall of Baekje in 660 came as a terrible shock to the Yamato royal court. Empress Saimei said:
"We learn that in ancient times there have been cases of troops being asked for and assistance requested: to render help in emergencies, and to restore that which has been interrupted, is a manifestation of ordinary principles of right. The Land of Baekje, in its extremity, has come to us and placed itself in our hands. Our resolution in this matter is unshakable. We will give separate orders to our generals to advance at the same time by a hundred routes."

Crown Prince Naka no Ōe, later to become Emperor Tenji, and Empress Saimei decided to dispatch an expeditionary force led by Abe no Hirafu (阿倍比羅夫) to help the besieged Baekje restoration forces. The troops were largely local strongmen (kuni no miyatsuko) drawn from mostly western Honshū, Shikoku, and especially Kyūshū, although some warriors were also from Kantō and northeastern Japan.

Empress Saimei moved the capital to the Asakura temporary palace near the shipyards in northern Kyūshū to personally oversee the military campaign. As the main fleet set sail, the Man'yōshū records Empress Saimei composing a waka:

熟田津に 船乗りせむと 月待てば 潮もかなひぬ 今は漕ぎ出でな
Nikita tsu ni funanori semu to tsuki mateba, shio mo kanahinu: ima ha kogiide na.
I was going to wait for the moon to rise before embarking from Nikita bay, but the tide is up: go, row out now!

The Empress died in Tsukushi shortly after the last waves of Yamato troops departed for Korea. The Crown Prince (Tenji) carried her remains back to Asuka. Tenji, dressed in white mourning clothes, set up his residence in the Nagatsu temporary palace in Kyūshū, and continued to oversee the expeditionary operation.

Around August 661, 5,000 soldiers, 170 ships, and the general Abe no Hirafu all arrived in territory controlled by the Baekje restoration forces. Additional Japanese reinforcements, including 27,000 soldiers led by Kamitsukeno no Kimi Wakako (上毛野君稚子) and 10,000 soldiers led by Iohara no Kimi (廬原君), arrived in 662.

The battle
In 663, Baekje restoration forces and the Yamato navy convened in southern Baekje with the intent to relieve the capital of the Baekje restoration movement in Churyu, which was under siege by Silla forces. The Yamato navy was to ferry ground troops to Churyu via the Geum River and lift the siege. However, Tang also sent 7,000 soldiers and 170 ships to blockade Yamato reinforcements from relieving the capital.

On 4 October 663, the advance guard of the Japanese fleet tried to force their way, but Tang ships held firm, repelling the attacks and maintaining disciplined ranks.

On 5 October 663, the second day of the battle, the arrival of Japanese reinforcements made their forces several times larger than the Tang fleet arrayed against them. However, the river was narrow enough where the Tang fleet could cover their front and protect their flanks as long as they maintained their ordered battle lines. The Japanese were confident in their numerical superiority and attacked the Tang fleet at least three times throughout the entire day, but the Tang fought off each attack. Towards the end of the day, the Japanese became exhausted, and their fleet lost cohesion through their repeated attempts to break through Tang lines. Sensing the right moment, the Tang fleet moved reserves and counterattacked, breaking both the left and right flanks of the Japanese, enveloping their fleet and crowding in the ships so they could not move or retreat. Many Japanese fell into the water and drowned, and many of their ships were burned and sunk. The Yamato general Echi no Takutsu was killed after striking down more than a dozen men in close quarters combat.

Japanese, Korean, and Chinese sources all point to heavy Japanese casualties. According to the Nihon Shoki, 400 Japanese ships were lost in the battle. Chinese sources claim 10,000 Japanese deaths.

Silla participation in the battle involved cavalry forces that defeated Baekje restoration ground troops which were supporting the Yamato navy on the banks of the river. It is not clear whether or not this took place before or during the time that the Japanese navy went to battle the Tang ships.

On 13 October 663, without Yamato troops to lift the siege, the fortress of Churyu surrendered to Silla and Tang forces. Buyeo Pung took a boat and fled with several followers to Goguryeo.

Aftermath
The Battle of Baekgang was Japan's greatest defeat in its premodern history. Japan's losses were enormous. Japan lost a key ally on the East Asian continent in Baekje and power on the Korean Peninsula. Due to the scale and severity of their defeat, the Yamato court feared an invasion from either or both Tang or Silla. In response, they built a huge network of shore fortifications throughout the rest of the 600s. In 664, the Yamato court established frontier guards and signal fires in Tsushima Island, Iki Island, and northern Kyushu. Also, embankments storing water were built around the fortresses in Kyushu, which were collectively called the Water Fortress. In 665, the Yamato court sent Baekje generals and artisans to construct a rampart in Nagato province, and two ramparts in Kyūshū. In 667, a rampart was constructed in the Yamato region, another one at Sanuki, and yet another at Tsushima island. Unaware of the outbreak of the Silla-Tang War (670–676), the Japanese would continue to build fortifications until 701, after finding out that Silla was no longer friendly with Tang.

With the fall of Baekje and Goguryeo, the only country in East Asia that was hostile to the Tang at that time was Japan. At the same time, there were calls for the strengthening of national power in preparation for the invasion of the Tang Dynasty, and there was an urgent need for reform of the political system and the development of laws. Thereafter, the imperial family was at odds over the future direction of Japan. As a result, the Jinshin War broke out. The war was won by Emperor Temmu, and from then on, the centralization of power in Japan progressed. Even after the death of Emperor Temmu, Empress Jitō maintained his policy. In 701, under the Taihō Code, the name of Japan was changed from "Wakoku (倭国)" to "Nihon (日本)".

For Baekje, the battle was the knockout blow that ended any hope of reviving the kingdom. Many Baekje people fled to either Goguryeo or Japan. Baekje royalty who fled to Japan were given the same ranks and titles in the Yamato court and non-royal Baekje refugees were given de facto citizenship status or special artisan status.

The last Baekje king, Buyeo Pung, abandoned the fighting Japanese and Baekje soldiers and fled to Goguryeo with a few of his retainers.

The victory gave Tang control of all former Baekje lands in Korea and a secure base in southwest Korea to launch a two-pronged invasion of Goguryeo with their ally Silla. The Silla–Tang alliance first launched attacks on Goguryeo from the south in 661, and the Goguryeo capital at Pyongyang finally fell in 668. In the same year, Tang established the Protectorate General to Pacify the East to control the Korean Peninsula.

Retrospective issues

The battle introduces interesting questions regarding Japan's relations with the Korean states and their level of development at the time. For example, why did the Japanese fare so badly against the Tang army? According to several scholars, it is clear that, in the 7th century at least, the Chinese had better weapons and, more importantly, their troops and officers were better trained and disciplined. Despite years of reforms modeled after mainland examples from China, the Yamato armies did not adopt the organized infantry tactics of Chinese armies. Furthermore, Yamato Japan was still a nascent and developing state run in practice by local strongmen (although in theory by the royal court) and without any real form of unified command. In addition, Japanese soldiers were drawn from many corners by local "strongmen" that controlled their own territories (in an early form of feudalism). Among the Japanese, any standardization in either weapons or unit tactics is believed to have been minimal at best.

Many scholars have also puzzled over why Yamato went through so much effort to protect Baekje. Bruce Batten summarized:

"Why the Japanese should have thrown themselves with such vigor into a war that, if not quite an intramural Korean conflict, had at least no direct bearing on Japanese territory, is not easy to answer."

The battle, as well as all the preparation behind it, clearly illustrates (aside from any other documentation) the strong ties between Yamato Japan and Baekje of Korea transcending the usual interstate military, political, or economic interests. The linguist J. Marshall Unger suggests, based on linguistic evidence, that Baekje could represent a remnant proto-Japanese or para-Japanese community, which had stayed behind on the Korean peninsula after the Yayoi migrations, but still maintained a conscious connection to the Yayoi people and their descendants. In any case, the phenomenon of elite refugees fleeing political conflict on the peninsula and settling in Yamato had been recurring in waves since at least the 5th century.

See also
 Naval history of Korea
 Naval history of China
 Naval history of Japan
 Largest naval battle in history

Notes

References

Bibliography
 Aston, W. G. (translated by) 1972 Nihongi: Chronicles of Japan from the Earliest Times to A.D. 697. Published by Charles E. Tuttle Company: Tokyo, Japan.
 Farris, William Wayne 1995 Heavenly Warriors: The Evolution of Japan's Military, 500–1300 AD. United States: Published by The Council on East Asian Studies, Harvard University, Cambridge.
 Jamieson, John Charles. The Samguk sagi and the Unification Wars. Ph.D. dissertation, University of California, Berkeley, 1969.

External links
 작성자 : 견적필살
 Beakgang Battle
 The end of the Battle of Hakusukinoe
 Baekgang Battle

663
Baekgang
Baekgang
Baekgang
Baekgang
Baekgang
History of North Jeolla Province
Baekgang
7th century in China
7th century in Korea
Japan–Korea relations
Emperor Tenji
Baekgang